Leutnant Justus Grassmann ( – 2 November 1961) was a World War I flying ace credited with ten aerial victories—seven enemy airplanes and three observation balloons.

Aerial service
Grassmann originally served with Flieger-Abteilung (Flier Detachment) 32. He joined Jagdstaffel 10 (Fighter Squadron 10) 10 at the age of 21, on 17 October 1917. He did not score his first win until 5 June 1918; however, he continued to score until November 5, just before the Armistice. He is believed to have shot down and wounded William Samuel Stephenson, (a Canadian pilot, code named "Intrepid" for his later work with British intelligence) on 28 July, ending his combat career.

Sources of information

References
 Above the Lines: The Aces and Fighter Units of the German Air Service, Naval Air Service and Flanders Marine Corps 1914 - 1918 Norman L. R. Franks, et al. Grub Street, 1993. , .

1961 deaths
1890s births
German World War I flying aces